Gronowice may refer to the following places in Poland:
Gronowice, Lower Silesian Voivodeship (south-west Poland)
Gronowice, Opole Voivodeship (south-west Poland)